Kazuya Murata (村田 和哉, born July 23, 1985) is a Japanese former professional baseball outfielder in Japan's Nippon Professional Baseball. He played for the Hokkaido Nippon-Ham Fighters from 2008 to 2014.

External links

1985 births
Living people
People from Nagareyama
Chuo University alumni
Japanese baseball players
Nippon Professional Baseball outfielders
Hokkaido Nippon-Ham Fighters players
Baseball people from Chiba Prefecture